Te Matenga Tamati (?–1914?) was a notable New Zealand  religious leader, prophet and healer. Of Māori descent, he identified with the Ngati Kahungunu and Ngati Rongomaiwahine iwi.

References

Year of birth missing
1914 deaths
New Zealand Māori religious leaders
Ngāti Kahungunu people
Ngāti Rongomaiwahine people